Cymarin (or cymarine) is a cardiac glycoside.  Plants of the genus Apocynum, including Apocynum cannabinum and Apocynum venetum, contain cymarin.  Cymarin is a cardiac glycoside and an anti-arrhythmia and cardiotonic agent.

References

External links

Cardenolides